Rawlings is an unincorporated community and census-designated place (CDP) in Allegany County, Maryland, United States, on the McMullen Highway (U.S. Route 220). As of the 2010 census, the Rawlings CDP had a population of 693.

The community was named after Moses Rawlings, an officer in the Revolutionary War. It was originally known as "Rawlings Station" after a post office was established on the railroad there on March 7, 1856.

Demographics

References

Census-designated places in Allegany County, Maryland
Census-designated places in Maryland
Cumberland, MD-WV MSA
Populated places in the Cumberland, MD-WV MSA
Populated places on the North Branch Potomac River